Franciszek Edward Pfeiffer, nom-de-guerre Radwan (January 21, 1895 in Łódź – June 13, 1964 in London) was a Polish military commander, Brigadier General of the Polish Army, commander of the Region I Śródmieście of the Home Army during the Warsaw Uprising, cavalier of the Order of Virtuti Militari

Edward Pfeiffer was born in 1895 in a middle-class family in Łódź. He also attended high school there and between 1910 and 1912 he helped to found the Polish Scouting Association and a secret school organization "Collegial Self-Help" whose purpose was education in the Polish language (partly banned or restricted in the Russian Empire) and the study of Polish history. The group also distributed books which had been banned by the Tsarist censors.

Honours and awards
 Gold Cross of the Order of Virtuti Militari, previously awarded the Silver Cross
 Cross of Independence
 Cross of Valour - four times
 Gold Cross of Merit with Swords
 Order of Lāčplēsis, 3rd class (Latvia)

References

1895 births
1964 deaths
Home Army members
Polish military personnel of World War II
Warsaw Uprising insurgents
Recipients of the Gold Cross of the Virtuti Militari
Recipients of the Cross of Independence
Recipients of the Cross of Valour (Poland)
Recipients of the Cross of Merit with Swords (Poland)
Recipients of the Order of Lāčplēsis, 3rd class
Military personnel from Łódź
Polish emigrants to the United Kingdom
Polish people of German descent